The South Korea national football team (recognized as Korea Republic by FIFA) represents South Korea in men's international football and is governed by the Korea Football Association. South Korea has emerged as a major football power in Asia since the 1980s, having participated in ten consecutive and eleven overall FIFA World Cup tournaments, the most for any Asian country. Despite initially going through five World Cup tournaments without winning a match, South Korea became the first (and so far only) Asian team to reach the semi-finals when they co-hosted the 2002 tournament with Japan. South Korea also won two AFC Asian Cup titles, and finished as runners-up on four occasions. Furthermore, the team won three gold medals and three silver medals at the senior Asian Games.

The team is commonly nicknamed the "Reds" by both fans and the media due to the color of their primary kit. The national team's supporting group is officially referred to as the Red Devils.

History

Early history

First World Cup team (1954)

Foundation of Yangzee (1967)

Golden generation (1986)

Tragedy of Marseille (1998)

Hiddink's magic (2002)

Captain Park era (2008)

Proactive football (2022)

Team image

Nicknames
The South Korea national football team has been known or nicknamed as the Taegeuk Warriors and the Tigers of Asia.

Kits and crest

Red is the traditional shirt color of the South Korean national team, who are consequently nicknamed the "Reds", while the fans are called the "Red Devils". The away shirt has varied between white and blue. In 1994, the home shirt shifted from red to white, but in October 1995, red returned as home color, paired with black shorts.

South Korea used to wear the South Korean flag as their shirt badge until 2001, when their tiger crest was unveiled. On 5 February 2020, the KFA announced a new, more simplistic logo. The emblem retained the tiger, albeit in a more minimalist design, enclosed in a rectangular frame. Red, blue and white, South Korea's traditional colors, have been maintained in the new logo.

Kit suppliers

Kit deals

Home stadium

The South Korea national team played their first home match at the Dongdaemun Stadium on 21 April 1956. The match was a qualifier for the 1956 AFC Asian Cup against the Philippines. They currently play their home matches at several stadiums, which are also used by K League clubs.

Rivalries
South Korea's greatest rival is Japan. This rivalry is an extension of a competitive rivalry between the two nations that goes beyond football, and some matches in the past have been tainted with controversy. South Korea leads the all-time series with 42 wins, 23 draws and 16 losses.

A rivalry has also developed with Iran. The two nations have played against each other officially since 1958, totalling 33 matches as of March 2022, including eleven World Cup qualifiers. South Korea and Iran were among the strongest Asian national teams during the 1960s and 1970s. Although the teams only had one chance to play against each other in the final match of the AFC Asian Cup, in 1972, they have faced each other five consecutive times in the quarter-finals between 1996 and 2011, with each team recording two wins, two losses, and a draw. Iran leads the all-time series with 13 wins, 10 draws and 10 losses.

Another major rival is Australia. South Korea trails behind Australia with 8 wins, 11 draws and 9 defeats. In major competitions, South Korea won only two official matches against Australia, and also lost in the 2015 AFC Asian Cup Final.

South Korea has had great success against China, with China failing to defeat them in 28 competitive matches before finally winning a game in 2010. They also possess a strong rivalry with North Korea, though matches are infrequent due to diplomatic and security reasons.

Supporters

The official supporter group of the national team, the Red Devils, were founded in 1995. Known for their passionate support, they are commonly referred to as the 12th man. Their most common chant is "Dae-Han-Min-Guk" ('Republic of Korea' or 'Great Korea'), followed by five claps. The FIFA Fan Fest was introduced at the 2002 FIFA World Cup in South Korea.

Recent results and fixtures

    
The following is a list of match results in the last 12 months, as well as any future matches that have been scheduled.

2022

2023

All-time results

Coaching staff

Players

Current squad
The following players were called up for the friendly matches against Colombia and Uruguay on 24 and 28 March 2023, respectively.

Caps and goals updated as of 5 December 2022, after the match against Brazil.

Recent call-ups
The following players have also been called up to the South Korea squad within the last twelve months.

Notes
INJ = Withdrew due to injury

Notable former players
The following players were inducted into the KFA Hall of Fame, or were selected for the Korean Best XI of All Time in one or more surveys.
Goalkeepers
Hong Deok-young (1948–1954)
Lee Se-yeon (1966–1973)
Lee Woon-jae (1994–2010) Defenders
Kim Jung-nam (1964–1973)
Kim Ho (1966–1972)
Hong Myung-bo (1990–2002)
Lee Young-pyo (1999–2011) Midfielders
Kim Yong-sik (1948–1950)
Huh Jung-moo (1974–1986)
Lee Young-moo (1975–1981)
Cho Kwang-rae (1977–1986)
Park Chang-sun (1979–1986)
Park Ji-sung (2000–2011) Forwards
Lee Hoe-taik (1966–1977)
Cha Bum-kun (1972–1986)
Choi Soon-ho (1980–1991)
Kim Joo-sung (1985–1996)

Individual records 

Players in bold are still active with South Korea.

Most appearances

Top goalscorers

Competitive record
 Champions   Runners-up   Third place    Tournament played on home soil

FIFA World Cup

Olympic Games
Football at the Summer Olympics has been an under-23 tournament since 1992.

AFC Asian Cup

Asian Games
Football at the Asian Games has been an under-23 tournament since 2002.

EAFF Championship

Other competitions

Head-to-head record
The following table shows South Korea's head-to-head record, correct as of 5 December 2022.

Honours
 FIFA World Cup
 Fourth place: 2002

 Afro-Asian Cup of Nations
  Champions: 1987

 AFC Asian Cup
  Champions: 1956, 1960
  Runners-up: 1972, 1980, 1988, 2015
  Third place: 1964, 2000, 2007, 2011

 Asian Games
  Gold medalists: 1970, 1978, 1986
  Silver medalists: 1954, 1958, 1962
  Bronze medalists: 1990
 Fourth place: 1994

 CONCACAF Gold Cup
 Fourth place: 2002

 EAFF Championship
  Champions: 2003, 2008, 2015, 2017, 2019
  Runners-up: 2010, 2022
  Third place: 2013
 Fourth place: 2005

 Minor competitions
 Korea Cup: 1971, 1974, 1975, 1976, 1978, 1980, 1981, 1982, 1985, 1987, 1991, 1997
 Merdeka Tournament: 1960, 1965, 1967, 1970, 1972, 1975, 1977, 1978
 King's Cup: 1969, 1970, 1971, 1973, 1974, 1975, 1998
 Jakarta Anniversary Tournament: 1981
 Dynasty Cup: 1990
 LG Cup: 2000, 2001, 2006

 Awards
 FIFA World Cup Most Entertaining Team: 2002
 AFC National Team of the Year: 2002, 2009
 EAFF Championship Fair Play Award: 2008
 AFC Asian Cup Fair Play Award: 2011

See also

Football in South Korea
South Korea national football B team
South Korea national under-23 football team
South Korea national under-20 football team
South Korea national under-17 football team
South Korea women's national football team

References

External links

 of the Korea Football Association 
Korea Republic at FIFA

 
AFC Asian Cup-winning countries
Asian national association football teams